The Neveh Shalom Synagogue (lit. House of Peace) is the only synagogue of the Ashkenazi community in Suriname.

History
The lot on Keizerstraat 82 was acquired in 1716 by Sephardi Jews. The original building was completed in 1723. The first Surinamese synagogue was located in the Jodensavanne, originally built of wood between 1665 and 1671 (but already rebuilt with bricks), however many had moved to Paramaribo. Originally, the synagogue was for both the Ashkenazim and the Sephardim community. The synagogue was sold to the Ashkenazim in 1735, and the Sephardim formed a separate community known as Tzedek ve-Shalom. The two communities have merged in the 1990s, and hold services in alternating buildings and alternating rites.

The current synagogue on the Keizerstraat 82 lot, designed by architect J.F. Halfhide, was completed in 1842. Construction started on 3 July 1835 in the presence of Prince Henry of the Netherlands.

The synagogue contains a small museum about the history of the Jews in Suriname.

Over the years the synagogue has transitioned from Orthodox to liberal, accepting interfaith couples and non-Jews.

The Mosque Keizerstraat is adjacent to the synagogue.

Gallery

See also

History of the Jews in Suriname

References

External links

 
Neve Shalom Web site
Discovering Suriname's Jewish past - and present Washington Post,  February 18, 2011

1843 establishments in Suriname
1723 establishments in the Dutch Empire
18th-century synagogues
Ashkenazi Jewish culture in South America
Ashkenazi synagogues
Buildings and structures in Paramaribo
Orthodox Judaism in South America
Orthodox synagogues
Religious buildings and structures completed in 1723
Neoclassical synagogues
Reform Judaism in South America
Reform synagogues
Sephardi Jewish culture in South America
Sephardi Reform Judaism
Sephardi synagogues
Synagogues completed in 1843
Synagogues in Suriname